Cold Harbour is a 2013 South African crime thriller film directed by Carey McKenzie. It follows the story of a Cape Town policeman investigating a murder that he suspects might be gang-related.

Cast
Tony Kgoroge as Sizwe Mia
Fana Mokoena as Specialist
Deon Lotz as Col. Venske
Nan Yu as Soong Mei

Development and production
Development for the film began before 2007, but was put on hold due to a lack of financing during the 2008 financial crisis.

During development of the film, McKenzie and cinematographer Shane Daly decided that the visual look of the film should be desaturated, shot on anamorphic lenses, and moving the camera "as much as possible". Most of the film was shot handheld, with the exception of some Steadicam shots. Tony Kgoroge did all his own stunts in the film.

Release and reception
Cold Harbour premiered at the Chicago International Film Festival on 12 October 2013, and later showed at the Durban International Film Festival on 19 July 2014. The film also won the film festival's Best Actor award for Tony Kgoroge's performance. It was released nation-wide in South Africa on 25 July 2014.

Writing for Screen Anarchy, Stuart Muller described the film as "a bold, starkly beautiful, and thought-provoking film with plenty to savour". Alex Isaacs of Channel24 wrote, "There are lots of things that could have been better about this thriller, but overall I think it’s one of the best South African movies that I have seen in a while because it doesn’t spoon-feed the audience and ask it to choose between who is right and who is wrong."

The film was nominated for two awards at the 2015 Africa Movie Academy Awards: Best Actor in a leading role and Best First Feature Film by a Director.

References

External links

2013 crime thriller films
2013 films
Afrikaans-language films
English-language South African films
Films set in Cape Town
South African crime thriller films
Xhosa-language films
2010s English-language films
2013 multilingual films
South African multilingual films